The Heys Collection is a collection of philatelic material relating to amateur radio operators in Europe between 1930 and 1997 that forms part of the British Library Philatelic Collections. The collection includes stamps, QSL cards and international reply coupons among other things. It was formed by John Heys and donated to the library in 2001.

References

British Library Philatelic Collections